Claudia Cazacu (born 1982) is a Romanian trance and tech house DJ, record producer and remixer.

She was born in Târgoviște, Romania. In 1998 she moved to London to study for a Finance and Banking degree.

Cazacu began DJing upon arriving in London. In 2007 she founded her own record label "Couture". Cazacu has worked with trance ikons such as Sied Van Riel, Fabio Stein and Alex Morph.

Discography

Singles 
2007:
 Couture
 Cowgirl
 Scared
2008:
 International Departures
 Elite
 Contrasts (with Sied van Riel)
 2012 EP
2009:
 Earproof
 Quatrain
 Freefalling (feat. Audrey Gallagher)
 Manequin / Size Zero
 Lekker / Nefertiti
 Glamour (vs. Vicky Devine)
2010:
 Valley of the Kings
 Quatrain 3 & 4
 Solar Flare
 Translucent
 Cafe Del Mar
 Rain
 Timelapse
 Quatrain 5
2011: 
 Maison
 Lights Off (with Sied van Riel)
2012:
 Labyrinth
 Quatrain 6
2013:
 Emerge

Remixography 
 The Space Brothers – "Everywhere I Go"
 Energy 52 - "Cafe Del Mar"

References

External links

1982 births
Living people
Club DJs
Women DJs
Romanian DJs
Romanian record producers
Remixers
Electronic dance music DJs
21st-century women musicians
Romanian women record producers